The scribble-tailed canastero (Asthenes maculicauda) is a species of bird in the family Furnariidae. It is found in Argentina, Bolivia, and Peru. Its natural habitat is subtropical or tropical high-altitude grassland.

References

scribble-tailed canastero
Birds of the Peruvian Andes
Birds of the Bolivian Andes
Birds of the Southern Andes
scribble-tailed canastero
scribble-tailed canastero
Taxonomy articles created by Polbot